Bodker or Bødker may refer to:
 Benni Bødker (born 1975), Danish writer
 Cecil Bødker (1927–2020), Danish writer, most famous for the use of the character "Silas" in her books
 Henrik Bødker (born 1983), Danish professional football midfielder
 Mads Bødker (born 1987), Danish ice hockey defenceman
 Mike Bodker, current mayor of Johns Creek, Georgia, US
 Mikkel Bødker (born 1989), Danish ice hockey right winger
 Ronni Lykke Bødker, chairman of Hjernerystelsesforeningen
 Susanne Bødker, Danish computer scientist